Khodovarikha is a point in the coast of the Pechora Sea located on a landspit projecting eastwards over the bay. Latitude: 68° 57' Longitude: 53° 45'

Khodovarikha belongs to the Nenets Autonomous Okrug administrative region, which is an autonomous okrug of Arkhangelsk Oblast.

History
There is a lighthouse at Khodovarikha that used to be an important beacon for the Russian convoy route coming from the Yugorsky Strait in World War II. It was shelled in 1942 by the Kriegsmarine during Operation Wunderland. The lighthouse ceased operation in 1996.

There was a small populated place close by that has been abandoned. However, there is still a functioning weather station in Khodovarikha.

Khodovarikha was the subject of a 2015 RT documentary Arctic Limbo, chronicling the isolation of the weather station staff in August of that year.

References

External links 

 Pictures

Landforms of Nenets Autonomous Okrug
Barents Sea